Learning is the debut studio album by American singer-songwriter Perfume Genius. The album was released on June 22, 2010 by Matador Records.

Track listing

References

2010 debut albums
Perfume Genius albums
Matador Records albums